Jógvan is a Faroese masculine given name. People bearing the name Jógvan include:
Jógvan Hansen (born 1978), Faroese singer and guitar player
Jógvan Heinason (1541–1602), first Minister of the Faroe Islands
Jógvan Justinusson (????-16???), former Prime Minister of the Faroe Islands 
Jógvan Isaksen (born 1950), Faroese writer and literary historian
Jógvan á Lakjuni (born 1952), Faroese politician, composer and teacher
Jógvan Martin Olsen (born 1961), Faroese footballer, coach and manager
Jógvan Poulsen (16??-16??), former Prime Minister of the Faroe Islands 
Jógvan Sundstein (born 1933), Faroese politician 

Faroese masculine given names